William McGuire may refer to:

William Anthony McGuire (1881–1940), American screenwriter and dramatist
William Henry McGuire (1875–1957), Canadian senator
William J. McGuire, American social psychologist
William W. McGuire (contemporary, born 1948), American physician; former CEO of UnitedHealth Group
William Francis McGuire, American actor
Billy and Benny McGuire, "World's Heaviest Twins"
William McGuire (editor) (1917–2009), editor with Princeton University Press
William McGuire (footballer) (fl. 1881), Scottish international football player
William McGuire (judge), one of the three first judges of the Mississippi Territory
William T. "Bill" McGuire, a man murdered by his wife in 2004

See also
Bill McGuire (disambiguation)